Ramiro Fernando Martínez (born 18 April 1991) is an Argentine professional footballer who plays as a goalkeeper for Almirante Brown.

Career
Martínez began with Boca Juniors of the Argentine Primera División. In July 2013, Martínez joined Primera B Metropolitana side Estudiantes on loan until December 2015. He made his Estudiantes debut on 7 February 2015 in a Copa Argentina win against Almagro. A week later he made his pro league debut versus Villa San Carlos in a 0–0 draw. He went on to make forty-four Primera B Metropolitana appearances before returning to Boca Juniors. Two years later, Martínez left Boca permanently without featuring for the first-team and subsequently made the move to Godoy Cruz. He joined on a free transfer and signed a two-year contract.

He was released by Godoy Cruz at the conclusion of the 2017–18 Argentine Primera División campaign. In January 2019, Almirante Brown of Primera B Metropolitana signed Martínez.

Personal life
Andrés Montenegro, a former professional footballer, is Martínez's cousin.

Career statistics
.

References

External links
 

1991 births
Living people
Sportspeople from Mar del Plata
Argentine footballers
Association football goalkeepers
Argentine Primera División players
Primera B Metropolitana players
Boca Juniors footballers
Estudiantes de Buenos Aires footballers
Godoy Cruz Antonio Tomba footballers
Club Almirante Brown footballers